Gryfina, or Agrippina (c. 1248between 1305 and 1309) was a Princess of Kraków by her marriage to Leszek II the Black in 1265; she later became a nun and abbess.

Family
Gryfina was the daughter of Rostislav Mikhailovich (1225–1262), Prince of Halych, and his wife Anna of Hungary (1226–c. 1270), daughter of Béla IV of Hungary. After losing the throne of Halych, Rostislav fled to Hungary and was received at the court of his father-in-law, King Béla IV. Rostislav was later granted the administration of Slavonia, one of the most important regions of the Hungarian Medieval Kingdom. Gryfina was born in Hungary, where she was raised with her sisters. One of her sisters was Kunigunda, who married Ottakar II of Bohemia and was the mother of Wenceslaus II of Bohemia.

Marriage
In 1265, at the age of seventeen, Gryfina was married to Leszek, son of Casimir I of Kuyavia. The wedding was organized by Bolesław V the Chaste. Between 1271 and 1274 the spouses separated, Gryfina having publicly accused her husband of impotency. Leszek sought treatment, but the marriage remained childless. After four years, Bolesław V forced a reconciliation between the spouses.

During the revolt against her husband in 1285, Gryfina took refuge in Wawel under the care of the citizens. During the third Tatar raid of 1287 she escaped with her husband to Hungary, where many of her family members lived.

Widowhood
After the death of her husband in 1288, Gryfina's nephew Wenceslaus II of Bohemia claimed Poland on the basis of his aunt's marriage. Gryfina retired to the monastery of the Poor Clares in Stary Sącz. The prioress there was her mother's sister, Kinga, the widow of Bolesław V the Chaste. After Kinga's death, Gryfina became abbess.

In 1300, she visited Bohemia and cared for Elisabeth Richeza of Poland, daughter of Przemysł II and fiancee of her nephew Wenceslaus since the death of his first wife Judith of Habsburg. Gryfina died between 1305 and 1309, most likely in 1309. She is buried in the Convent of St. Agnes in Prague.

Notes and references

Date of birth unknown
1240s births
1300s deaths
13th-century Polish women
14th-century Polish women
Piast dynasty
Polish queens consort
Olgovichi family
Poor Clare abbesses
13th-century Polish people
14th-century Polish people